Andronikos I may refer to:

 Andronikos I Komnenos (1183–1185), Byzantine Emperor
 Andronikos I of Trebizond (1222–1235), Emperor of Trebizond